Cichociemni (the "Silent Unseen") were elite special-operations paratroopers of the Polish Army in exile, created in Great Britain during World War II to operate in occupied Poland (Cichociemni Spadochroniarze Armii Krajowej).

A total of 2,613 Polish Army soldiers volunteered for training by Polish and British SOE operatives. 
Only 606 people completed the training, and eventually 316 of them were secretly parachuted into occupied Poland. 
The first operation ("air bridge", as it was called) took place on 15 February 1941. This operation was conducted by Captain Józef Zabielski, Major Stanisław Krzymowski and political courier Czesław Raczkowski.  
After 27 December 1944 further operations were discontinued, as by then most of Poland had been occupied by the Red Army.

Of 316 Cichociemni, 103 perished during the war: in combat with the Germans, executed by the Gestapo, or in crashes. A further nine were executed after the war by the Polish People's Republic; the communist regime was hostile to the Cichociemni, considered to be English/British ideologised infiltrators. Ninety-one Cichociemni operatives took part in the Warsaw Uprising of 1944.

Name
The origins of the name are obscure and may never be known with certainty.  "Silent Unseen" probably related to how some soldiers seemingly disappeared from their line units overnight to volunteer for special operations service, and it also describes those "who appear silently where they are least expected, play havoc with the enemy and disappear whence they came, unnoticed, unseen."<ref>Kazimierz Iranek-Osmecki, The Unseen and Silent, p. 350.</ref>

The Silent Unseen were trained initially in Scotland in preparation for missions for the Polish underground in occupied Poland, such as building-clearance and bridge-demolition. In 1944, training was also carried out in Brindisi, Italy, which had fallen to the Allies.

Initially, the name was informal and was used mainly by soldiers who volunteered to parachute into Poland. However, from September 1941 the name became official and was used in all documents. It was applied to the secret Polish Headquarters training unit created to provide agents with necessary knowledge, money and equipment and to agents who were transported to Poland and other German-occupied countries.

History
On 30 December 1939 Captain Jan Górski, a Polish Army officer who had escaped to France after the invasion of Poland, drew up a report for the Polish Chief of Staff.  Górski proposed creating a secret unit to maintain contact with the underground ZWZ, using a group of well-trained envoys.  After his report was ignored, Górski resubmitted it several times. Finally the commander of the Polish Air Force, General Zając, replied that, while creation of such a unit would be a good move, the Polish Air Force had no means of transport and no training facilities for such a unit.

Górski and his colleague Maciej Kalenkiewicz continued studying the possibility of paratroops and special forces. After the capitulation of France, they managed to reach the United Kingdom. They studied documents on German paratroops and drafted a plan to create in exile a Polish airborne force to be used in covert support operations. The force was to be employed solely in aid of a future uprising in occupied Poland. Their plan was never adopted, but on 20 September 1940 the Polish commander-in-chief, General Władysław Sikorski, ordered the creation of Section III of the Commander-in-Chief's Staff (Oddział III Sztabu Naczelnego Wodza). Section III's purpose was contingency planning for covert operations in Poland, air delivery of arms and supplies, and training of paratroops.

Training
Soon after, the General Staff's Section III began recruiting volunteers. Those selected left their erstwhile units in secret, silently and at night – hence, the perhaps at first facetious name, Cichociemni ("Silent Unseen").  Of 2,413 candidates, only 605 managed to complete the training and pass all the tests; of those, 579 qualified for airlift.

The volunteers included 1 general, 112 staff officers, 894 officers, 592 non-commissioned officers (NCOs), 771 privates, 15 women, and 28 civilian emissaries of the Polish Government in Exile. The training established by the General Staff's Section VI (Oddział VI Sztabu Naczelnego Wodza) and the British Special Operations Executive (SOE) comprised five courses:
 workout course (kurs zaprawowy)
 psychological and technical investigations course (kurs badań psychotechnicznych)
 parachuting course (kurs spadochronowy)
 covert-operations course (kurs walki konspiracyjnej)
 briefing course (kurs odprawowy)

During the first phase of training, all the volunteers were taught to use every kind of weapon (British, Polish, German, Russian and Italian weapons) and mines. In additional courses, the soldiers were trained in basic covert operations, topography, cryptography, and sharpshooting. They were also taught details of life in occupied Poland, from German-imposed laws to current fashions in occupied Warsaw. The fourth course included all kinds of covert operations, jujitsu, and shooting at invisible targets. The briefing course included learning a new, false identity. All soldiers who passed the training were sworn in as members of the Home Army.

Air bridges

The first air-bridge operation took place on 15 February 1941. The Allied air commands carried out 483 air-bridge operations all together, losing 68 planes to crashes and enemy fire. Apart from the Silent Unseen themselves, some 630 tons of war materiel were delivered in special containers. In addition, agents delivered the following sums of money to the Home Army:
 40,869,800 forged zlotys;
 US$26,299,375 in banknotes and gold;
 £1,755 in gold;
 RM 3,578,000.

Through 27 December 1944, 316 soldiers and 28 emissaries successfully parachuted into Poland. Additionally, 17 agents were dropped into Albania, France, Greece, Italy and Yugoslavia. An unknown number of Poles (including the best known, Krystyna Skarbek) were also parachuted into France by the British Special Operations Executive to start an underground movement among the half-million-strong Polish minority.

Though the Silent Unseen were organized in collaboration with SOE, it was largely independent. The Polish section of SOE was the only one which freely chose its own men and operated its own radio communications with an occupied country. Additionally, the identities of the Polish agents were known only to the Polish General Staff. Those transported to Poland included soldiers of all grades. The oldest was 54 years old, the youngest was 20. As a rule, all volunteers were promoted one rank at the moment of their jump.

The fight
In Poland the Silent Unseen were assigned mostly to special units of the ZWZ and Home Army. Most of them joined Wachlarz, Związek Odwetu and KeDyw. Many became important staff officers of the Polish Secret Army and took part in Operation Tempest and uprisings in Wilno, Lwów and Warsaw.

The Silent Unseen assumed various duties in German-occupied Europe. Some 37 worked in intelligence, 50 were radio operators and emissaries, 24 were staff officers, 22 were airmen and airdrop coordinators, 11 were instructors of armored forces and instructors in anti-tank warfare at secret military schools, 3 were trained in forging documents, 169 were trained in covert operations and partisan warfare, and 28 were emissaries of the Polish government.

Famous Silent Unseen
The most notable Silent Unseen included:

Losses
Of 344 men transported to Poland, 113 were killed in action:
 84 in fighting against the Germans, or arrested and tortured to death by the Gestapo;
 10 committed suicide in German prisons or concentration camps;
 10 were executed by the Communists during or after the war;
 9 were shot down with their planes before reaching their targets.

Of 91 Silent Unseen who took part in the Warsaw Uprising, 18 were killed in action.

Postwar
The first book on the Silent Unseen was published in England in 1954.  The Polish edition, Drogi cichociemnych: opowiadania zebrane i opracowane przez koło spadochroniarzy Armii Krajowej, was published by Veritas; and an English edition, The Unseen and Silent:  Adventures from the Underground Movement, Narrated by Paratroops of the Polish Home Army, was published by Sheed and Ward.

The Polish edition was republished in England several times, last in 1973.  A miniature version of Drogi cichociemnych was published in two volumes in communist Poland in 1985 by Kurs.

General Stefan Bałuk's memoir, Byłem Cichociemnym (I was a Cichociemny), was published in 2008. He was 94 years old when it first appeared in bookstores.  In 2009 it was translated into English as Silent and Unseen: I was a WW II Special Ops Commando.

On 4 August 1995, the Polish special-forces unit GROM adopted the name and traditions of the Cichociemni.

Polish TV has produced a series, Czas honoru (Time of Honour), about the Silent Unseen.

See also
 Armia Krajowa
 KeDyw
 Polish government-in-exile
 Stanisław Sosabowski
 Warsaw Uprising Museum
 Western betrayal

Notes

Bibliography
 Ian Valentine, Station 43: Audley End House and SOE's Polish Section, The History Press, 2006, p. 224, .
 Hubert Królikowski, Tobie Ojczyzno – Cichociemni:  Wojskowa Formacja Specjalna GROM im. Cichociemnych Spadochroniarzy Armii Krajowej, 1990-2000, Gdańsk, 2001.
 P. Bystrzycki, Znak cichociemnych, Warsaw, 1985.
 Drogi cichociemnych, Warsaw, 1993.
Kazimierz Iranek-Osmecki, The Unseen and Silent:  Adventures from the Underground Movement, Narrated by Paratroops of the Polish Home Army, Sheed and Ward, 1954.
 Jędrzej Tucholski, Cichociemni, Warsaw, Instytut Wydawniczy PAX, 1984, ..
 Jan Szatsznajder, Cichociemni:  Z Polski do Polski (The Silent Unseen:  From Poland to Poland), Wrocław, 1985.
 C. Chlebowski, Cztery z tysiąca (Four of a Thousand), Warsaw, KAW, 1981.
 G. Korczyński - Polskie oddziały specjalne w II wojnie światowej, Warsaw, Dom Wydawniczy Bellona, 2006, .
 Elżbieta Zawacka, Katarzyna Minczykowska'', Wydawnictwo Fundacji Archiwum Pomorskie Armii Krajowej, Toruń, 2007.

 
Military units and formations of Poland in World War II
Home Army
Guerrilla organizations
Military parachuting
Paratroopers
Special forces of Poland
Polish underground organisations during World War II
Polish resistance during World War II